Echinochloa oryzoides is a species of grass known by the common name early barnyard grass. Its origin is not certain but it may be Eurasia. The grass has been identified as a major weed of rice paddies and has been known to mimic rice.

References

External links
Jepson Manual Treatment
USDA Plants Profile
Grass Manual Profile

oryzoides
Cereals